Renjith Maheśwary (born 30 January 1986 in Kottayam, Kerala) is an Indian triple jumper. He finished fourth at the 2006 Asian Games and won the 2007 Asian Championships. He also competed at the 2007 World Championships, the 2011 World Championships and the 2013 World Championships but did not reach the final in any of those events. He represented India at the 2008 Beijing Olympics as well as in 2012 London Olympics. At the 2012 London Games as at the World Championships in Daegu, he committed three consecutive foul jumps at the qualifying stage, stopped his Olympic campaign. Renjith, had performed badly at the Beijing Olympics too, where he came up with a best of 15.77m. Later, he tested positive for a stimulant but was let off with a three-month suspension.

With a jump of 17.07 metres at the 2010 Commonwealth Games, Renjith held the Indian national record till 2014, when it was beaten by Arpinder Singh. Now Renjith made a new Indian record of 17.30 m in Indian grand prix meet at Bengaluru on 11 July 2016

Renjith Maheswary has won the gold medal in Asian Grand Prix 2012.

Renjith is married to Indian pole vaulter and National record holder V. S. Surekha and they have a daughter, Jhiya Renjith.

On 19 September 2013, Sports Ministry of India announced that he would not be given Arjuna Award over the allegations of doping pending against him. Earlier his name figured among the list of Arjuna Awardees for 2013.

See also
 List of Kerala Olympians
 List of Indian records in athletics

References

External links

1986 births
Living people
People from Kottayam district
Athletes from Kerala
Indian male triple jumpers
Olympic athletes of India
Athletes (track and field) at the 2008 Summer Olympics
Athletes (track and field) at the 2012 Summer Olympics
Athletes (track and field) at the 2016 Summer Olympics
Commonwealth Games bronze medallists for India
Commonwealth Games medallists in athletics
Athletes (track and field) at the 2010 Commonwealth Games
Athletes (track and field) at the 2006 Asian Games
Athletes (track and field) at the 2010 Asian Games
Athletes (track and field) at the 2014 Asian Games
Recipients of the Arjuna Award
Doping cases in athletics
Indian sportspeople in doping cases
Olympic male triple jumpers
Asian Games competitors for India
South Asian Games gold medalists for India
South Asian Games medalists in athletics
Medallists at the 2010 Commonwealth Games